Bar Harbor Airlines Flight 1808 was a scheduled flight from Logan International Airport to Bangor International Airport in the United States on August 25, 1985. On final approach to Auburn/Lewiston Municipal Airport, the Bar Harbor Airlines Beechcraft Model 99 crashed short of the runway, killing all six passengers and two crew on board. Among the passengers was Samantha Smith, a thirteen-year-old American schoolgirl who had become famous as a "Goodwill ambassador" to the Soviet Union and who had been cast on the television show Lime Street.

Timeline 
Flight 1808 normally stopped en route at Augusta and Waterville, Maine. The flight crew was made up of Captain Roy W. Fraunhofer and First Officer David C. Owen. The two had flown the aircraft from Bangor to Boston and back earlier that afternoon in worsening weather. On the second trip, they were advised at an en route stop in Augusta that because of air traffic control delays in Boston, their return flight 1788 via Auburn/Lewiston, Maine, was being cancelled. They would instead operate the later flight 1808 with Auburn added as a flag stop to accommodate passengers from flight 1788.

Flight 1808 boarded in Boston with 6 passengers; two for Auburn, three for Augusta and one for Waterville.  A fourth passenger had actually checked in for Augusta, but did not respond to boarding calls, so the flight left without him.  At 21:17 EDT, the captain radioed for clearance to Auburn. The controller, unaware of the change in routing, advised Flight 1808 was filed to Augusta. The captain accepted the routing, but advised he would amend the flight plan to Auburn after passing Pease VOR, near Portsmouth, New Hampshire. Flight 1808 departed the ramp at 21:26 and was cleared for takeoff from runway 4L at 21:30.

At about 22:00, Flight 1808 radioed the station agent at Auburn/Lewiston Municipal Airport for the latest weather. The  altimeter setting was supposed to be . Shortly after this call, a controller in Portland contacted Flight 1808 to advise that they were drifting east of the ILS approach course to runway 4 at Auburn. He advised them to turn to heading 340 to intercept. The captain responded "OK.” Almost a minute later, the controller advised Flight 1808 that they were passing the Lewie NDB beacon at the outer marker for the approach and asked if they were receiving the signal. The first officer responded "Affirmative.” The controller then cleared Flight 1808 to switch to the Auburn airport's frequency. This transmission was acknowledged by Flight 1808’s first officer and was the last transmission received from the flight. Portland controllers were notified less than 10 minutes later that the plane had crashed at 22:05.

Investigation 
Accident investigators were hindered by the absence of information from either a cockpit voice recorder or flight data recorder. The Beech 99 was not large enough for the FAA to require the installation of either piece of equipment. There was also no record of which pilot was flying the aircraft. Adding to the confusion, both pilots had used the radio during the flight. Typically, the non-flying pilot handles communications. It took more than three months to transcribe the communications between the plane and ground control and provide them to investigators. Examination of radar data from Portland showed that after Flight 1808 turned to heading 340 to intercept the approach, it flew through the approach course and had to make a 60° turn less than one mile (1.6 km) from the outer marker to get back on course. Altitude data from the aircraft’s transponder showed Flight 1808 did not begin its descent to intercept the precision approach until after passing Lewiston, when the plane was already above the glide slope for the approach. This may have caused the flight crew to rush both the descent and the approach and descend too steeply. The actual altimeter settings on both the captain's and the first officer's altimeters could not be determined due to fire and impact damage to the instruments. There were no survivors.

In its report, the National Transportation Safety Board noted that the controller in Portland used "poor judgment" while assisting the flight. However, it concluded that the captain accepted the large course correction and the crew continued flying an unstabilized approach instead of executing a missed approach. The flight crew also attempted to stabilize the approach while allowing the plane to fly below the glide slope of the approach.  The setting on Flight 1808 altimeters may have been incorrect and contributed to the flight crew descending below the published decision height for the approach. At night and in low visibility, the crew may have been unaware of their true position.

The NTSB recommended a review of controller procedures for outlying airports without ground radar to align with best practices. The NTSB further recommended that aircraft-for-hire capable of carrying six or more passengers be equipped with flight recorders.

Passengers

This accident attracted unusual media attention for a small commuter plane accident. Two of the three passengers headed for Augusta were Samantha Smith and her father, who were returning from London, England, at the time. Three years earlier she had written to Soviet General Secretary Yuri Andropov regarding her desire for peace between the United States and the Soviet Union. Andropov, in his reply, invited her and her family to tour the Soviet Union. In 1985, ABC hired her to be an actress on its new show Lime Street, which was filmed on location in London. She and her father were headed home during a break from shooting when the fatal accident occurred.

Jane Smith, Samantha's mother, filed a $50 million wrongful death suit against Bar Harbor Airlines in 1986. The case was settled out of court three years later for an undisclosed sum.

References

Further reading
 Aircraft Accident Report AAR-86-6 (PDF) National Transportation Safety Board
 
 Board blames pilot errors in commuter airline crashes

Bar Harbor, Maine
Airliner accidents and incidents in Maine
Accidents and incidents involving the Beechcraft Model 99
Airliner accidents and incidents involving controlled flight into terrain
Aviation accidents and incidents in the United States in 1985
Bar Harbor Airlines accidents and incidents
Disasters in Maine
1985 in Maine
August 1985 events in the United States